Muzhichi (Mužeče) is a rural locality (a selo) in Sunzhensky District of the Republic of Ingushetia, Russia, located on the left bank of the Sunzha River near the border with the Republic of North Ossetia–Alania. It forms the municipality of the rural settlement of Muzhichi as the only settlement in its composition.

Geography 
The village is located on the left bank of the river Assa, 37 km southwest of the district center - the city of Sunzha and 40 km southeast of the city of Magas.

The nearest settlements: in the north - the village of Galashki, in the east - the village of Dattykh and in the west - the village of Komgaron.

History 
The aul is named after the ancestor of the taip Muzhakhoy - Muzhkho. And the name of the village of Muzhichi in translation means "aul Muzhakhoy".

In 1859, the Orstkhoys were evicted from the village of Muzhichi. In 1860–1861, Cossack villages were founded on the site of the former Orstkhoy mountain villages, including the farm - Muzhichinskiy, but the constant attacks of the Ingush forced the inhabitants of the farm to go north, under the cover of the "Sunzhenskaya Cossack Line".

In 1872, the farm was settled by highlanders among 300 households from the Khamkhin and Tsorin societies, at the head of the settlers was Ozig Kotiev Meili-Khadzhi Espievich, a native of the Galgai village, who rented land from the tsarist administration and actually restored and revived the ancient village. At one time he served in the Sunzha regiment and had good relations with the authorities of the Terek region. Over the course of several decades, the village was settled by new settlers from the Khamkhin society, and already at the beginning of the 20th century, about a hundred households lived in Muzhichi. Among the first settlers were the Kotievs, Barkinkhoevs, Bogatyrevs, Aushevs, Gandarovs, Kostoevs, Balaevs, Dalakovs, Khakievs, Gaitukievs and others.

Since 1940, the museum of Sergo Ordzhonikidze has been functioning in the village, who in 1919 hid here for several months. The museum also contains exhibits from the excavations of the well-known in the scientific world "Meadow burial ground" of the 1st millennium BC. e. - the center of the "Koban culture" of the Bronze Age.

From 1944 to 1958, during the period of the deportation of Chechens and Ingush, and the abolition of the Chechen-Ingush Autonomous Soviet Socialist Republic, the village was called Lugovoe.

Historical places of ancient Ingush history are concentrated on the territory of the village: the valley of BIu-latt-Are (“valley of the army gathering”); the peak of Kh'-kholge ("Place of guards"); the castle peaks Ir-Buro-Kort (“Sharp peak of the fortress”), Yi'syana-Buro-Kort (“quadrangular peak of the fortress”); Sai-viin-duk ridge (“The ridge where Sai fell”); barrow Amash-gu ; barrow ridge Boarz-duk (“ridge of grave hills”); glade Malkha-ardash (“sunny allotments”); the heights of Ha-kerte (“top of the guard”) and Tov-zen-kort (“top shown for observation”), etc.

Taïps 
Taïp composition of the village:
Egakhoy (Aushev, Bogatyrovs, Gandarovs)
 Barkinkhoy (Barkinkhoevs, Dalievs, Kotievs
 Khoakhoy (Balaevs)
 Tskhoroy (Bisaevs)

Infrastructure 
The village has a secondary school, a library and other social and cultural institutions.

References

Bibliography 
 
 
 

Rural localities in Ingushetia